Telephone numbers in the United Kingdom have a flexible structure that reflects their historical demands, starting from many independent companies through a nationalised near-monopoly, to a system that supports many different services, including cellular phones, which were not envisaged when the system was first built. Numbers evolved in a piecemeal fashion, with numbers initially allocated on an exchange-by-exchange basis for calls connected by manual operators. Subscriber numbers reflected demand in each area, with single digit telephone numbers in very rural areas and longer numbers in cities. 

Beginning with London's director system, a need to automate telephone dialling resulted in every exchange being allocated either a unique Subscriber Trunk Dialling (STD) code or unique range of numbers within a wider dialling code area. For many years, calls dialled between nearby exchanges often required 'local codes' to select the most direct call route, rather than dialling the STD codes. 

Demand for telephone lines has grown and exchanges have been modernised, so many subscriber numbers have been lengthened and highly localised STD codes have been rationalised into wider area codes. Such was the demand for lines in London that the city's telephone area was first split into two separate dialling codes, before being merged again with a short dialling code and long subscriber numbers. Meanwhile, a need to find numbers for special services, such as mobile telephones and information services, initially led to confusion with traditional telephone numbers. 

From 1995, extensive renumbering exercises have led to specific number ranges being allocated to distinguish between traditional 'geographic' telephone numbers, mobile numbers and special services. Despite these rationalisations, there remains no standard format or length for a UK area code or telephone number, and there are misunderstandings in code areas which have seen alterations to customers' individual telephone numbers.

Origins 
The telephone service in the United Kingdom was originally provided by private companies and local councils. But by 1912–13 all except the telephone service of Kingston upon Hull and Guernsey had been bought out by the Post Office. The Post Office also operated telephone services in Jersey until 1923 and the Isle of Man until 1969 when the islands took over responsibility for their own postal and telephone services – although the Isle of Man system remained part of British Telecom until 1987.

Post Office Telecommunications was reorganised in 1980–81 as British Telecommunications (British Telecom, or BT), and was the first major nationalised industry to be privatised by the Conservative government. The Hull Telephone Department was itself reconstituted as Kingston Communications, in 1987; it was sold by Hull City Council in the late 1990s and celebrated its centenary in 2004.

Subscriber numbers 
From the introduction of the telephone to the early 1990s, telephone numbers in most of the United Kingdom were usually shown with a written exchange name followed by the subscriber number, e.g. 'Mallaig 10' or 'Aberdeen 43342'. This allowed calls to be placed initially through the operator and later by using local or national dialling codes. Exchange names were usually closely tied to the physical location of telephone exchanges, being either the name of a city, town or village or district. 

The length of early telephone numbers depended on the number of subscribers attached to a particular exchange: if there were fewer than 10 subscribers, a single digit sufficed. One single-digit number survived in Scotland until 1990. Two-digit numbers were sufficient on small exchanges with fewer than 100 subscribers, while exchanges with a few hundred lines used three-digit subscriber numbers, e.g. 200–499. Larger exchanges which covered thousands of lines used four-digit subscriber numbers, e.g. 2000–5999, or five-digit subscriber numbers, e.g. 20000–49999. 

As demand for telephones grew, more telephone numbers were required. This would often see an exchange with existing three-digit numbers open one or more new ranges with four-digit local numbers (e.g. 5000-6999), and exchanges with existing four-digit numbers open one or more new ranges with five-digit local numbers (e.g. 60000–69999). This piecemeal approach lasted until the 1980s when a shortage of numbers resulted in an overhaul of dialling codes and subscriber numbers.

As of 2020, 52 exchanges still have five-digit subscriber numbers of which a dozen places also have unusually long STD codes. One area with a long STD code retains four-digit local numbering (see Telephone Numbers in the United Kingdom for examples).

Director system 

In November 1922 the General Post Office decided to adopt the Strowger system after trialling several  automatic exchange systems; initially for small and medium towns and cities in Britain. But for London this required development of the Director telephone system by the Automatic Telephone Manufacturing Company (ATM) to enable operation with a mixture of both automatic and manual local exchanges in the London area for several decades. A  demonstration model of a "Director" exchange was shown by the developer ATM of Liverpool as part of the Post Office exhibits at the British Empire Exhibition at Wembley in 1924 and 1925. However, it was not until 1927 that the first "Director" telephone exchange was brought into service in Holborn, London and rolled out progressively across Greater London. Letters were assigned to each number from 2 to 0 on the telephone dial and a three-digit code, represented by letters, identified the local exchange. Telephone numbers were displayed preceded by the exchange name, with the first three letters highlighted to indicate the code, and number, such as WHItehall 1212.

Director schemes were gradually introduced in other major cities of the UK — Birmingham, Edinburgh, Glasgow, Liverpool and Manchester.

Introduction of area codes and local dialling codes in non-director areas 
Following successful trials of Rural Automatic Exchanges (RAX) from 1921, standardised automatic exchanges were gradually introduced to smaller towns and rural areas. Each RAX was connected to a 'parent' exchange in a larger town. At first, RAX exchanges only allowed subscribers to dial numbers on the same exchange: for numbers on other exchanges, subscribers had to dial '0' (or occasionally '01') to call an operator at a manual switchboard in the parent exchange. Later RAX exchanges introduced direct dialling to parent automatic exchanges by dialling '9' followed by the subscriber number, and direct connections to manual operators at other nearby exchanges by dialling 6, 7 or 8. This set the pattern for later local codes.  

'Large multichange exchange areas' were developed from 1925 to allow several 'satellite' exchanges within provincial cities to be connected to a main exchange, using different number ranges for each exchange without separate dialling codes. This has become known as a linked numbering scheme. 

The installation of Unit Automatic Exchanges (UAX) from 1937 introduced local dialling codes for the first time outside the Director areas: subscribers could now directly dial calls to and from nearby automatic exchanges using short dialling codes. Unlike Director codes or modern dialling codes, the code for a specific destination would vary from exchange to exchange: for example, the local code for Totnes was 997 from Bigbury, but 882 from Blackawton and 86 from Paignton. Trunk calls (long-distance calls beyond the local call charging area) still required connection by an operator.

Introduction of STD codes 

Subscriber Trunk Dialling (STD) was introduced in 1958 to allow subscribers to dial trunk calls without operator assistance. Uniform exchange codes, usually called STD codes, were allocated for every exchange in the country progressively as STD was rolled out. This process was not completed until 1979.

Change to Operator number 
In order to allow STD codes to begin with a uniform '0', the number used to call the operator was changed from '0' to '100' as STD was rolled out.

STD codes for director areas
The existing director areas were allocated a short area code, usually in the form 0x1 (01 for London). These were:

The codes 071, 081, and 091 were reserved for later expansion, with the former two eventually being temporarily allocated to London (see below).

Within the director areas, the first three digits of the seven digit subscriber number would relate to the local telephone exchange on which the number could be found. Before all-figure dialling, these were usually three-digit letter codes, based on the first three letters of the exchange name. For example, within the Liverpool director area, a number on the Anfield telephone exchange would be dialled as ANField xxxx and the number would be dialled by STD as 051 ANF xxxx. After the advent of all-figure dialling the number would be 051 263 xxxx.

Creation and numbering of new STD code groups 
Nearly 6000 exchanges needed to be assigned STD codes. In order to simplify the numbering, and to allow for future consolidation, exchanges were linked into just over 700 charge groups. Each charge group was assigned to a Group Switching Centre (which might handle more than one charge group) and allocated a four digit code. Where a town had its own GSC, the four digit code served as the STD code for this 'core' town. Smaller 'ring' or satellite exchanges in each group were initially assigned individual dialling codes based on the charge group's code.

The original concept was for there to be a nationwide Director system, and in common with the Director system, Group Switching Centres were originally based in major towns and assigned codes based on two letters of the respective place's name and the corresponding numbers on a telephone dial. The letters and numbers originally corresponded as follows on a UK telephone (note that US and modern UK telephones use a different allocation of letters to numbers):

For example Aylesbury was given the STD code 0AY6, where the letter A can be found on the number 2 and the letter Y on the number 9. The letter O became a zero, such as for Bournemouth: 0BO2 where BO = 20. To help the public remember the new codes they were initially advertised using this alphanumeric combination of 0 followed by two letters and at least one number. From 1966 all STD codes were displayed as numbers only. 

Originally, where a place's name began with the letter "O" the code would begin with two zeros, such as Oxford: 0OX2 where OX = 09. These codes starting with "00" were later reallocated, freeing the prefix 00 for use by calls to the Republic of Ireland, to radiophones and to premium rate numbers.

Dialling within STD exchange groups and conversion to linked numbering areas 
Some charge groups used a single STD code and then used distinct subscriber number ranges to route calls to the correct local exchange, such as 2xxxx for numbers on one exchange and 5xxxx for numbers on another, known as a linked numbering scheme. However, in most areas further codes were needed to route calls to the correct exchange within the charge group both for STD and local calls. Different codes were used for STD and local dialling. Because of this, telephone numbers were usually still stated with the exchange name and subscriber number, e.g. 'Blackawton 299', to allow callers to look up the appropriate code for their call.

Local dialling codes 
Dialling codes were already in use before the introduction of STD to allow customers to dial from one local exchange to another within a limited area, and these were retained to allow local calls to be dialled without the need to dial the full STD code. This also enabled local calls to be charged at a lower rate, and avoid the higher 'STD' call rates that were based on distance. Now known as 'local codes', these often began with a 9 for calls routed through a parent exchange and 6, 7 or 8 for calls routed through an adjacent exchange. The local code was typically only one, two or three digits, but might be even longer than the STD code if the call was routed through an intermediate exchange. Local codes were in use in some areas until the 1990s.

STD group code ranges including satellite STD codes 
Each Group Switching Centre was based in the exchange of a main town, with a four-digit STD code assigned to this 'core' exchange. Digits from the main town's local codes were often added to the end of the core exchange's STD code in order to provide a unique STD code for each 'ring' or satellite exchange. In written form these STD codes were split after the third digit to highlight this satellite exchange numbering. In many cases the local codes were later incorporated in the subscriber numbers to form longer numbers as part of the main exchange's linked numbering scheme.

A simple example is St Helens, which had two satellite exchanges: Rainford and Billinge. The STD codes for Rainford and Billinge combined the STD code for St Helens and the local dialling codes, which were later included in the subscriber numbers.

Charging areas without a 'core' code 
Where a charging group did not have its own Group Switching Centre, but was instead controlled by a GSC in a nearby charging group, there might not be a 'core' exchange on which to base STD codes. A code was chosen based on a town (not necessarily the most important), district or geographical feature in the area, such as 0BL8 (BLandford area), 0GI9 (Stowmarket area, named after the tiny village of GIpping), 0DN3 (Crediton area, taken from DevoN) and 0TV7 (Aberfeldy and Strathtay area, taken from Tay Valley).

For example, the Newton Abbot GSC controlled an Adjacent Charge Group around the southern part of Dartmoor with no 'core' exchange, and all the STD codes in the group were five digits long based on code 0DN4 (0364). All the exchanges are now incorporated into a linked numbering scheme on the 01364 area code, officially assigned to Ashburton.

Secondary STD code ranges for satellite exchanges 
In some charge groups with a large number of satellite exchanges, a separate STD code range was used for a ring of satellites and this led to even more complex numbering relationships.

For example, the Torquay charge group was issued with two STD code ranges: 0803 (0TO3) and 0804 (0TO4). The 'core' code of 0803 was allocated to a five-figure linked numbering scheme covering exchanges in Torquay (numbers starting with 2, 3 and 6) and Paignton (numbers starting with 4 or 5). 0804 was then introduced to cover a ring of 13 smaller satellite exchanges outside Torbay with subscriber numbers starting at 2xx or 2xxx on each exchange. Subscribers on the 0803 exchanges dialled local codes beginning 8 to call numbers on the 0804 satellites; for example, a local code of 822 was used to dial from Torquay to Dittisham, whose STD code was 080 422. Meanwhile, subscribers on 0804 satellite exchanges used a mixture of codes beginning 8 to route calls on direct paths to nearby exchanges, and codes beginning 9 to route calls to and through the main 0803 exchanges. As exchanges in the Torquay charging area were gradually modernised and moved to the (0803) linked numbering scheme, those with four-figure subscriber numbers had the Torquay local codes added as the first two digits of six-digit subscriber numbers, e.g. Totnes (080 46) 2125 − which had been locally dialled as 86 2125 from Torquay − became (0803) 862125. Exchanges in this area with three-figure numbers were given completely new number ranges, usually incorporating only the last digit of the old STD code, e.g. Blackawton (080 421) 299 became (0803) 712 299.

Just as modernisation of Torquay's area has seen 14 STD codes merged into one, the move to linked numbering areas across the country has led to about 5,600 remaining exchanges being covered by 658 dialling codes, and local codes no longer exist.

1968 area code changes
In 1968, area codes beginning 00 were changed.

Codes beginning 00 were also used for premium rate numbers or as a short code for dialling calls to various places in the Republic of Ireland over the next few decades.

All figure dialling 

The use of names in allocating STD codes was intended to provide a mnemonic for the exchange in the same way as for the Director system, but the mnemonic link was often obscure. A single charge group code would usually cover multiple exchanges in various locations, which were identified either by a linked numbering scheme or extended codes. This meant that many exchanges were given alphanumeric STD codes that did not relate to their names: Swallow's code of 0GR 289 only made sense if you knew it was connected to Grimsby, for example. In addition, telephones connected to automatic exchanges in non-director areas had been issued with dials that had numbers but not letters printed on them, so would need to have new dials fitted to enable alphanumeric dialling.

At the same time, international direct dialling was being introduced and as other countries (such as the USA) had different assignments of letters to digits the opportunity for confusion existed. An earlier modification to get round this problem for European dialling was the addition of the letter Q to the digit 0, which previously represented only the letter O. This was because some French exchanges had alphabetic codes including Q, but in the event France moved to all-digit codes before direct dialling from the UK was introduced.

The use of alphabetic exchange (area) codes was abandoned in the UK in 1966 in favour of all figure numbering. Nevertheless, about 60% of current area codes are still based on the original alphabetic STD codes.

Special services
Until the mid-1980s freephone numbers could be accessed only by ringing the operator on 100 and asking to be connected, e.g. Freephone 8963 for BT customer service. From 1985, the 0800 code came into use for freephone services. These numbers often had only 8 digits, e.g. 0800 1111 for ChildLine.

From around 1980, calls to Radiophones could also be direct dialled.

0034—Area 1 (Greater London)
0036—Area 2 (Severn and Midlands)
0037—Area 3 (Liverpool and the North-East)
0033—Area 4 (Southern and Eastern Scotland)
0039—Area 5 (Southern England)
These covered only a small part of the country.
The 0035 and 0038 codes were added later.

In the 1980s, these other allocations were also in use:

0055—"Talkabout"
0066—"Super Call"
0072—Radio Paging
0073—Radio Paging
0077—"Super Call"

Calls to the Republic of Ireland 
Until the late 1980s, calls to major towns and cities in the Republic of Ireland could also be made using short codes starting with 000:

0001—Dublin 01 area
0002—Cork 021 area
0004—Dundalk 042 area
0005—Waterford 051 area
0006—Limerick 061 area
0007—Letterkenny 074 area
0009—Galway 091 area
and
0015—Sligo

This was discontinued in the late 1980s, so that all calls to the Republic of Ireland from the UK had to be dialled in the normal international format using the international access code (initially 010 until 1995, and then 00) and country code (353). 

Calls could also be made using the full international dialling code since the introduction of International Direct Dialling.

While most of the Republic of Ireland could be direct dialled, a small number of rural areas did not have an automated telephone service until the 1980s. As a result, calls from the UK to these areas had to be made through the BT operator who connected the calls to their Irish counterpart for completion. Unlike other international calls, these were handled by the BT national operator, in the same way as UK operator calls. This service was withdrawn at noon on 28 May 1987 when the last manual exchange in Ireland, at Mountshannon, County Clare, was switched over to an Alcatel E10 digital exchange. This completed Telecom Éireann's (now called eircom) rural digitalisation project.

Although full international dialling is now used, calls from Northern Ireland landlines to landlines in the Republic are charged at UK national or local rates, and calls from Great Britain to the Republic are charged at a special "Republic of Ireland" rate, higher than inland rates, but lower than those for elsewhere in Western Europe.
Additionally, calls to Northern Ireland from the Republic of Ireland can be made without an international access code, but instead replacing the British 028 prefix not with the conventional international prefix 00 44 28 but with a shorter Irish 048 area code which specifically covers Northern Ireland. For example, calling Belfast from London would be 028 9xxx xxxx while calling Belfast from Dublin would be 048 9xxx xxxx. However, it is also possible to make calls using the normal international 00 44 28 xxxx xxxx format. In both cases, calls are charged at a much lower rate than calls to Britain.
In recent years, these arrangements are becoming less relevant as customers in both countries have access to a wide range of telephone service providers, cable telephony services, mobile operators and alternative services based on VoIP. Some providers include unlimited calls to the UK or Republic of Ireland (and many other countries) in various bundled packages.

Mixed areas in Northern Ireland
In Northern Ireland, many of the area codes were created as "mixed" areas. There were a number of code changes within Northern Ireland over the years with some exchanges swapping to different area codes.

In 1993, further changes were made throughout Northern Ireland in preparation for PhONEday in 1995. Many of the changes were eliminating 3-digit and 4-digit subscriber numbers in rural exchanges by adding extra digits; the table below shows the end result. The system of "mixed" areas remained in place.

Additional codes for mobile, freephone, non-geographic, premium rate and pagers
0459, 0802, 0831, 0839, 0860, 0881, 0891, 0893, 0897, 0898, 0921, 0941, 0961, 0979, 0987, 0998 and 0999 had never been used for geographic area codes, so could be used for non-geographic and mobile services as soon as the need arose. The prefixes listed in the table below were introduced at various times from the early 1980s to the mid-1990s. The details and timeline of these allocations is complex, and  most have since migrated to various 07, 08 and 09 ranges in the Big Number Change.

Other codes had multiple uses over the years. For example, 0500 was originally assigned to a 'ring' of exchanges around Edinburgh which were moved to the 031 linked numbering scheme (0131 after PhONEday); some years later, 0500 was used for Mercury Freephone services.

Canonbie was moved from 054 15 to the new Langholm 038 73 "mixed" area (0138 73 after PhONEday). 0541 5 was then re-allocated as the National Rate non-geographic code for C&WC AreaCall which then became 0870 15 in the Big Number Change.

Hornsea was moved from 0401 to join with the existing Patrington allocation at 0964 (01964 after PhONEday). This created the 0964 Hornsea and Patrington ELNS area. 0401 later went on to be used for Cellnet mobile until moving to 07701 in the Big Number Change.

Some prefixes had dual usage when no longer used for geographic area codes. Basildon originally had two charge group code ranges – 0268 for the town and 0374 for rural exchanges – which were merged to a linked number scheme on 0268. The 0374 5 number block was used for National Rate calls while the rest of the 0374 range was used for Vodafone mobile phones. Likewise, after subscribers on the Weardale 0956 charge group code were migrated to the Bishop Auckland STD code, the 0956 7 block was used for personal numbering and the rest of 0956 was used for One-to-One mobile telephones.

The area codes 0921, 0987, 0998 and 0999 were never used., the last of which due to possible confusion with the 999 emergency number.

By the early 1990s it was becoming more difficult to remember the various codes that might cost a lot more to call than a local or national call, and many consumers were caught out with larger than expected bills. A more long-term solution would need to be found as it was clear that mobile usage in particular was going to push demand for new codes even further in the coming years.

Number shortage 
Several factors caused a shortage of telephone numbers in the 1980s. Both subscriber numbers and dialling codes began to run out.

Within existing area codes, the growth in second phone lines, direct dial-in (DDI) lines, fax machines and a need to find number ranges for new telecoms operators caused the demand for telephone numbers to exceed the available number ranges. The removal of local dialling codes freed up some number ranges, and piecemeal addition of digits to the start of subscriber numbers allowed new number ranges to be opened on exchanges with short subscriber numbers, but towns which already used four digit codes and six figure numbers could not add extra digits, because the trunk network could not handle numbers of more than nine digits after the 0 trunk prefix.

Rapid expansion of mobile and premium rate services quickly filled up number ranges on dialling codes that had not been allocated as STD codes, and there was a need to expand the number of dialling codes available in the future. Combining exchanges into ELNS and 'mixed' areas freed up a limited number of codes.

Creation of ELNS areas to free up area codes 
In order to free up space for mobile, non-geographic, premium rate and pager services, 16 of the original STD codes with low number use were merged into 14 existing ranges so that each area code would cover multiple charge groups (these migration figures do not include the similar 091 area code changes). Four further STD codes were replaced entirely by a new 'Tyneside' area code.

For example, numbers in Barrow-in-Furness already used the ranges starting (0229) 2 and (0229) 5. Millom used the separate 0657 area code, but was already controlled by the Barrow-in-Furness Group Switching Centre. Millom numbers were transferred to the 0229 area code using number ranges beginning (0229) 3 and (0229) 7.

Under the new "ELNS" (Extended Linked Numbering Scheme) arrangement, two or more charge groups now share the same area code and the leading digit of the local number indicates which charge group the number belongs to. The new area code retains both of the old area code names. A diagram showing the principle is shown on page 9 of Oftel's telephone numbering guide and these areas are shown in the table below. Calls within the area code do not require the area code to be dialled, this is true even for calls between the charge groups.

Of the 16 area codes freed up for alternative use in the 1980s, at least 11 were re-used for other services. For example, the 0401 area code was re-allocated to Cellnet mobile services. Five of the area codes remained unused, including 01632, which is now partially reserved for fictitious telephone numbers. In 1995, the PhONEday changes for geographic numbers solved the number shortage problem for mobile and non-geographic services by freeing up the whole 07, 08 and 09 range for their use from 2000 onwards.

On PhONEday in 1995, 0229 became 01229 and 0964 became 01964 and these codes are still in use today. The remainder of the "ELNS" area code allocations and their history are detailed in the table below.

The Cellnet mobile 0401 allocation stayed in use for about a decade before these numbers were transferred to the 07701 range in the Big Number Change in 2000. Nowadays all 16 of the area codes freed up in the 1980s (albeit now with a 1 prefix, e.g. 0401 is now 01401) remain unused and are available for future geographic expansion.

Creation of mixed areas
In order to free up further space for mobile, non-geographic, premium rate and pager services, 17 original geographic STD codes with low number use were condensed into 6 ranges under a "mixed" scheme. This involved creating new dialling codes that were extensions of existing area codes, mimicking the 'Core' and 'Ring' pattern of early STD codes.

For example, numbers in Dumfries already used (0387) 2 and (0387) 5, while numbers in Langholm were 4 or 5 digits long and used the 0541 area code. Langholm numbers were changed to 5 digits and transferred to the newly created 03873 area code.

Under the new "mixed" arrangement, although 0387 and 03873 have the same first four digits, they are treated as completely separate area codes. All calls from one area to the other require the area code to be dialled. Local numbers in Dumfries cannot begin with a "3".

On PhONEday in 1995, 0387 became 01387 and 03873 became 013873 and these codes are still in use today. The remainder of the "mixed" area code allocations and their history are detailed in the table below.

Of the 11 area codes freed up for alternative use in the 1980s, only 5 were actually re-used for other services. For example, the 0541 area code was re-allocated to C&WC Area Call services. Six of the area codes remained unused.

The C&WC 0541 allocation stayed in use for more than a decade before these numbers were transferred to the 0870 1 range in the Big Number Change in 2000. Nowadays all 11 of the area codes freed up in the 1980s (albeit now with a 1 prefix, e.g. 0541 is now 01541) remain unused and are available for future geographic expansion.

Widespread renumbering of dialling codes and number ranges 
In order to allow for future growth, and to separate geographic and non-geographic number ranges, a number of significant changes were to be made to the UK numbering plan. All these stages were planned out in one exercise in the early 1980s, though the exact dates for each stage was decided later.

Even without the need for expansion, consumers were already becoming confused as to what they would be charged for any particular call, with for example (0404) xxxxx being a call to Honiton in Devon and (0403) xxxxxx being a much more expensive call to a mobile phone. The situation in the early 1990s was as follows:

The next few changes would fix these problems.

Splitting 01 for London into 071 and 081
The first major change was in May 1990, when the London 01 area code was replaced with 071 and 081. Local numbers remained seven digits long. Exchanges in central London used the 071 code. The remaining exchanges now used the 081 code and formed a ring around the 071 area. Although this effectively doubled the available numbers from eight to sixteen million, it was not to be the last change for the capital.

This change freed up the entire 01 code range for the next step of the plan: converting all geographic area codes to begin 01. That operation would then free up the whole of the 02 to 09 range for a future re-organisation of some geographic and all mobile and non-geographic numbers. Most areas would see two code changes over the next decade, whilst London would have a total of three. It would be a decade before this inner/outer London split was eventually nullified.

Initial allocations with 10 digits: freephone 0800 numbers
The longest telephone numbers in use until now had been 9 digits long (not including the 0 trunk code), e.g. 051 234 5678, 0303 456789, 03873 56789, 0800 445566. The long term plan is for migration to 10 digit numbering in the UK and in 1991 this started with new 0800 numbers being allocated with 10 digits.

Oftel administers number allocation from 1994
With multiple operators joining the market, administration was passed to an independent regulator. Oftel took over administration of the UK’s telephone numbers from BT in 1994.

Changes to geographic numbers in 1995 (PhONEday)

Addition of '1' to geographic area codes 
On "PhONEday", 16 April 1995, the digit "1" was inserted into all UK geographic area codes, including those in the director, all-figure dialling, ELNS and mixed areas. Under the new changes, for example, Inner London's 071 became 0171; Outer London's 081 became 0181. A small selection of the codes that changed are shown in the table below:

This was done with a view to reorganising the numbering plan at a later date, so that the first and second digits would indicate the type of service called:

Introduction of replacement area codes 
Five new area codes were introduced for cities that were running low on phone numbers—and a digit was prefixed to each existing local number to allow for future expansion.

Most of the initial local number ranges created by PhONEday were exhausted within just a few years. New local numbers then began to be allocated with a different initial digit. For example, in Sheffield (0114) when the 2xx xxxx numbers were exhausted, new numbers (other than old recycled ones) then began to be issued from the 3xx xxxx range. Similarly, newly allocated numbers in Leeds (0113), Leicester (0116) and Bristol (0117) also came from the 3xx xxxx range, but in Nottingham (0115), the new numbers instead came from the 8xx xxxx range.

Less than a decade later, further new ranges were opened in most of these areas. See table above for further details.

PhONEday changes to National Dialling Only numbers 
One early solution to a shortage of numbers had been to allocate number ranges that could only be dialled with the full area code, including numbers beginning 0 and 1. These ranges were not normally used for subscriber numbers, because dialling them without using the area code might result in the call being connected to another number altogether. For example, if Leeds (0532) 100xxx were dialled from within Leeds without the area code, the caller would be connected to the Operator on 100 before the remaining digits would be accepted. These numbers were designated 'National Dialling Only' numbers and usually assigned to automatic equipment, such as burglar alarms or dedicated lines for computer modems, or as the destinations for non-geographic numbers.

International calls from the UK
The international access code also changed on "PhONEday", from 010 to 00 thus meeting the international call prefix standard set by the International Telecommunication Union (ITU).

112 emergency number in addition to 999
In 1995, the United Kingdom adopted the pan-European 112 emergency services number. This new number runs alongside the existing 999 number, first introduced in 1937.

Changes between PhONEday and the Big Number Change

New dialling code for Reading 

Reading numbers endured two changes in a very short time. PhONEday, on 16 April 1995, changed the area code from 0734 to 01734, and then almost a year later, on 8 April 1996, it changed again to (0118). At that time, local numbers were changed from six to seven digits by inserting a 9 in front of the old local number. Parallel running of the old numbering was withdrawn on 9 January 1998.

National Dialling Only numbers in Reading were changed as follows:

New personal numbers with revenue-share start using 070
In 1995, the 070 prefix began to be allocated for personal numbers (PNS). These new numbers had 10 digits.

New numbers at 070 107x xxxx were held aside in order for FleXtel personal numbers at 0956 7xxxxx to migrate in the forthcoming Big Number Change in 2000.

The geographic area codes 0700 to 0709 had only recently been moved to 01700 to 01709 on PhONEday. New 070 personal number allocations had to be chosen carefully such that mis-dialled calls for old pre-PhONEday geographic numbers would fail to connect rather than connect the caller to a user of a new personal number. Oftel identified old (070x) xx geographic number ranges that had not been used before and re-allocated those first.

For example, The Welwyn Garden City (0707) 4x range (now 01707 4x) had never been used, so 070 74xx quickly came into use for personal numbering in 1996. However, the (0707) 3x range (now 01707 3x) had been in use within Welwyn Garden City, and these numbers remained protected by Oftel for a number of years. The 070 73xx range of numbers finally came into use for personal numbering in 2007.

070 numbers initially allowed revenue share. These numbers are easy to mistake for mobile phone numbers and many scams developed. Oftel consulted on various proposals. Eventually revenue share was banned on these lines and they also fell under the jurisdiction of ICSTIS (nowadays PhonepayPlus), the premium rate services regulator.

New mobile numbers start using 077xx, 078xx, 079xx
Geographic numbers had been moved to begin 01 in the PhONEday changes in 1995. Pre-existing mobile phone, non-geographic, premium rate and pager services continued to use the same 9-digit 02xx xxxxxx to 09xx xxxxxx numbers as before. It would be several more years before these would add a digit to become 10-digit numbers and move to the 07, 08 and 09 ranges in the Big Number Change in 2000-2001.

From May 1997, new mobile phone services started using numbers beginning 077, 078 or 079 re-using area codes recently vacated by 9-digit geographic numbers. These new mobile numbers have 10 digits.

BT Cellnet started with 07801 xxxxxx, 07803 xxxxxx, 07808 xxxxxx and 07809 xxxxxx. Vodafone started with 07771 xxxxxx and 07775 xxxxxx in May 1997. One2One started using 07804 xxxxxx and 07806 xxxxxx numbers in May 1995. 07xxx codes for new allocations by operators have been issued by Oftel since May 1997. It would be another few years before older BT Cellnet 0802 xxxxxx numbers were converted to 07802 xxxxxx, Vodafone 0370 xxxxxx numbers were converted to 07770 xxxxxx and One2One 0961 xxxxxx numbers were converted to 07961 xxxxxx in the Big Number Change.

New pager numbers start using 076
Pre-existing pager numbers were already scattered under various codes in the 02xx to 09xx range and had 9 digits. Several services used non-standard 01 numbers. These would all eventually be moved to 076 codes and to 10 digits in the Big Number Change in 2000.

From 1998 onwards, new pager numbers began to be issued in parts of the 076 range. These new numbers had 10 digits.

Various parts of the 076 range were set aside for pager number migration in the forthcoming Big Number Change in 2000.

The number range 07624 xxxxxx was set aside for mobile telephones in the Isle of Man. This would also come into use as a part of the Big Number Change.

"08" consumer protection
The initial plan for the new "08" number range was such that rates charged to people calling an 08 telephone number would be made more clear by linking the cost of the call to the second digit of the National Significant Number. Numbers starting 080 would be free (except from mobile phones), while 082 would be cheaper than 089.

New freephone numbers start using 0808
In 1997, Oftel released 10-digit numbers beginning 0808 designated as freephone services. These calls are free only from a landline or public payphone.

Both BT and Mercury issued only 10-digit freephone numbers to users after 1997. With the market opened up to competition, many other companies also allocated these numbers to users.

Usage of pre-existing 10- and 9-digit 0800 numbers and pre-existing 9-digit 0500 numbers continued as before.

Additionally, numbers in the range 0808 80x xxxx are reserved for not-for-profit helplines and as such are usually free to call from most mobile telephones. A number of other numbers can also called for free from mobiles, but this varies by network.

New non-geographic revenue-share numbers start using 0845 and 0870
From 1996 onwards, Oftel brought various new 10-digit non-geographic 0845 and 0870 numbers into use.

Only certain sub-parts of each code were made available for immediate use. Numbers at 0845 7, 0845 9, 0870 1, 0870 4, 0870 5 and other ranges were set aside for numbers such as 0345, 0374, 0541, 0645 and 0990 that would be migrating from 9-digits to 10-digits and to these two 08xx codes in the forthcoming Big Number Change in 2000.

In these early days, the price for calling 0845 numbers from landlines was tied to BT's price for calls to local geographic numbers. Similarly, the price for calling 0870 numbers from landlines was tied to BT's price for national calls to geographic numbers.

NHS direct
The short number 0845 1888 was set aside in March 1998 for trials of the new NHS direct service with calls charged at the "local rate". At a later date, the number was changed to 0845 46 47.

Warnings from Oftel
After the migration of geographic 0xxx area codes to new 01xxx codes on PhONEday (also 0xx → 01xx and 0xxxx → 01xxxx of course), some of the old area codes had started to be re-used for other purposes. For example, 0870 (Isle of Benbecula, Outer Hebrides) had been moved to 01870 and now 0870 started to be re-used for non-geographic services. Oftel had to issue a warning to operators to remove their "this number has changed, please redial inserting a one after the initial zero" messages that had been applied on PhONEday so that callers could get through to the new non-geographic numbers.

Premium rate and mobile problems
With the diverse usage and pricing of similar looking codes there could easily be a nasty shock when the bill arrived. Office phone systems could be set to block various premium rate prefixes, but it was important to regularly review and update the list. For those that did not, problems accessing some numbers were beginning to develop. The 0930 code was mainly used for premium rate services, but 0930 7xxxxx was used by One2One for mobile telephone services. Some people found that calls to all 0930 numbers were barred and hence also those mobile phones. To overcome this, the 0961 7xxxxx range was mirrored on to 0930 7xxxxx. These were all 9-digit numbers.

New premium rate services start using 090x
From 1998 onwards, 090x numbers with 10 digits started coming into use for premium rate services. As with 084 and 087 numbers, certain small number blocks within the 090x range were set aside for migration of old premium rate codes in the forthcoming Big Number Change.

The 09 number range was originally subdivided as follows:

From 23 August 1999, Oftel added the 0905 range as by then 0906 was almost fully allocated.

Internet for schools
Announced in November 1997 and issued from February 1998 onwards the 0820 range was designated "internet for schools".

Number conservation
As the number of lines in use continued to grow, some areas became close to full capacity. In the late-1990s, Ofcom signalled a number of areas of concern.

Of these, only Coventry was immediately addressed - by migration to the 024 code and eight digit subscriber numbers in the Big Number Change in 2000. The Bournemouth, Aberdeen, Brighton, Bradford and Middlesbrough (as well as Milton Keynes, despite not being initially highlighted in the report) areas were later addressed in 2012 and 2014 by requiring 11-digit dialling for local calls (see the 2012 and 2014 local number dialling sections below), as an interim measure until shorter area codes and 8 digit local numbers are introduced.

Broadband services
The 092x to 099x range was designated "broadband services".

The allocation was never used and eventually removed from the plan in 2005.

Number ranges formerly used by local dialling codes
Between the 1930s and 1990s, calls between nearby exchanges could often be dialled using a "short code", often beginning 7, 8 or 9. As exchanges were combined into linked numbering schemes, these local codes were either absorbed into longer subscriber numbers or withdrawn in favour of full STD codes by the late 1990s. After a short delay, 6-digit subscriber numbers beginning 7 or 8 began to be issued in these 01xxx areas, and with 5-digits in 01xxxx areas. In the mid- and late -2000s, some of these areas also started issuing subscriber numbers beginning 9.

"Big Number Change" in 2000 

With 02x area codes freed up by the previous reorganisation, they could be re-used. On 22 April 2000 the second phase of the plan came into operation, dubbed the "Big Number Change". This changed the area codes of seven areas, including both inner and outer London and the whole of Northern Ireland. These areas had already had a code change (to insert a "1") five years earlier as a part of PhONEday. The Big Number Change altered the area codes again, and increased the length of subscriber numbers to 8 digits.

020 for London

The Big Number change meant that London returned to a single area code again (as in the old 01 days), with no "inner/outer" split. Existing London numbers acquired the prefixes 7 or 8, but from that point on (020) 7xxx xxxx and (020) 8xxx xxxx numbers were assigned or reused anywhere in the London area covered by the single (city-wide) 020 code.

From June 2005 the regulator, Ofcom, ceased to allocate new number blocks to suppliers in the 7xxx xxxx and 8xxx xxxx ranges. From this date onwards all number allocations were in the 3xxx xxxx range and can be used anywhere in the London 020 area. Although new blocks of 7xxx xxxx and 8xxx xxxx range numbers are no longer being allocated to suppliers, those that have not yet exhausted their existing blocks are able to continue to issue and re-issue them to their customers.

Numbers in the 020 0xxx xxxx and 020 1xxx xxxx number ranges have also been made available. However, these numbers cannot be dialled without the 020 code and are called "National Dialling Only" numbers. They are mainly used as termination points for non-geographic numbers, and for various alarm and other automated systems where the actual telephone number itself is never called

Geographic numbers in England and Wales outside London 

Although Southampton and Portsmouth are one code from a code structure and local dialling point of view, calls between them are not treated as local calls for pricing purposes.

It is planned that the new codes will eventually cover a larger area than at present. For example, although (029) currently covers just the Cardiff area, it may in the future cover all of Wales.  Conveniently, this could be 0AW (All Wales) if area codes ever become partially alphabetic again.

Geographic numbers in Northern Ireland 
A unified code for Northern Ireland of (028) was introduced to replace eight area codes. The transition codes for Northern Ireland are shown below. 

The prefixes for existing numbers in Northern Ireland are split up into seven groups, roughly based upon the county in which the main exchange is based. The initial digit of each phone number is based on the designated county—for example, the first county alphabetically is County Antrim so numbers in this county start with 2. The next county is County Armagh so numbers here start with 3. One exception to this is the Greater Belfast area, initial digit 9, which is extended to include each adjacent former STD code area, including the towns of Bangor, (County Down) (91), Lisburn (92), Carrickfergus (93), Antrim (94) and Saintfield (97).
The encompassed former STD codes at some points extend to over 20 miles from Belfast itself. There is a much more complete list in the Big Number Change article.

The 028 area can be accessed from the Republic of Ireland using either the domestic code 048, or the international prefix 00 44 28.

National Dialling Only numbers
Existing National Dialling Only numbers were remapped in each area code.

Non-geographic, and mobile and pager numbers 
In addition, mobile and pager numbers were all moved into the 07xxx range. Pagers moved into 076xx, while personal numbers moved to 070. Mobile phone numbers moved into the 077xx, 078xx and 079xx ranges (and more recently, 075xx and 074xx have also been brought into use).

The exception to this was Manx Telecom mobile phone numbers, where the code became 07624 in order to match the 01624 used for landlines.

In addition, lower and higher rate non-geographic numbers (previously called lo-call or local-rate and national-rate numbers, though these terms are no longer recommended to be used as they can be misleading)
 migrated to 08xx and premium rate numbers migrated to 09xx.

A summary of the migration path for the existing mobile and pager codes, as they were at the time, is shown below:

Changes from 2000 to 2009

2000 introduction of 055 corporate numbers
In 2000, Oftel started allocating 055 numbers for corporate numbering. These numbers have 10 digits. Uptake of these numbers has been low.

055 114x xxxx numbers have been used for the BT Broadband Voice service since December 2003, one of their bigger customers being Abbey (now Santander) bank.

2000 introduction of 0844 and 0871 non-geographic revenue-share numbers
In 2000, Oftel started allocating non-geographic 0844 and 0871 revenue-share numbers. These numbers have 10 digits. Initially, uptake of these numbers was low, but increased dramatically from 2005 onwards.

These numbers look similar to 0845 and 0870 numbers but are often charged at a different rate. From their inception until around 2005, call costs from landlines looked like this:

080x—No charge to caller
0844—Up to 5p/min from BT landlines, set by terminating operator
0845—Originating landline operator's "Local Rate"
0870—Originating landline operator's "National Rate"
0871—Up to 10p/min from BT landlines, set by terminating operator

The call price for 0844 and 0871 numbers from a BT landline is the revenue-share premium and no additional markup, by regulation. From landlines other than BT, the call price for 0844 and 0871 numbers is usually higher than from BT landlines as those other operators add their own unregulated markup on top of the revenue share.

From mobiles, 080 numbers cost from 10 to 30 pence per minute and calls to 084 and 087 numbers cost up to 50 pence per minute at that time. The revenue share is only a small proportion of the cost billed to callers when using a mobile.

After 2005, most landline providers no longer differentiated between local and national calls, charging a single geographic rate for calling 01 and 02 numbers nationwide. Many landline providers also started offering inclusive call bundles for 01 and 02 numbers and by 2011 the vast majority of landline phone users were on this type of deal. Bundled minutes from mobiles include 01, 02 and 07 numbers. Bundles effectively make all calls to 01 and 02 numbers "free" for very many people. Since 2005, it has been illegal to describe 084 numbers as "local rate" or "lo-call" or 087 numbers as "national rate".

A small number of landline providers and a smaller number of mobile providers have allowed 0870 (and a few landline providers have also allowed 0845) numbers to be used in inclusive minutes bundles. However, 0844 and 0871 numbers are never inclusive. From landlines, 084 and 087 numbers cost anything up to 20 pence per minute. From mobile phones, 084 and 087 numbers cost anything up to 45 pence per minute. The price includes a revenue-share "premium" or "service charge" of up to 5 pence per minute for 0844 numbers and up to 10 pence per minute for 0871 numbers. The premium is passed on to the terminating telecoms company.

Due to persistent abuse of 0871 numbers these have been under the remit of the Phone-paid Services Authority (previously known as ICSTIS and PhonepayPlus) since 2009.

In 2013/2014, the Consumer Rights Directive will make 084, 087 and other numbers charged at above geographic rate, illegal to use for customer service and complaints lines.

2001 introduction of 091x premium rate numbers
In 2001, additional premium rate numbers in the 091x range started to be allocated. Initially just 0911, but latterly also 0912 and 0913.

09 numbers were regulated first by ICSTIS and then after 2007 by PhonepayPlus.

2002 introduction of 118 xxx numbers to replace 192 directory enquiries
Until 2002, the domestic directory enquiries service within the UK had been reached by dialling 192 from a landline. The service had been run solely by BT. In December 2002, the market was opened up by Oftel for new providers to run additional directory enquiries services in competition. BT's 192 service moved to 118 500, and dialling 192 ceased working in August 2003. New providers used 118 118, 118 247, 118 855 and many others. Nowadays there are more than a hundred such providers and more than 130 different tariffs.

As with 09xx premium rate numbers, the usage of 118 xxx directory enquiry numbers was regulated by ICSTIS (later PhonepayPlus).

2003 new 0908 numbers for adult services
In 2003, the 0908 number range came into use, as 0909 was now almost fully allocated.

2003 area name changes

In 2003, Oftel published a proposal to create a National Telephone Numbering Plan. This draft plan proposed changing the names of many areas from whatever name BT had previously used. Following responses from BT, C&W and others, the final plan was published with a number of amendments incorporated, followed by a minor revision a few weeks later. A few months later, the data and the responsibility for maintaining it was passed to Ofcom.

Ofcom's data is contained in two files: the NTNP PDF file (updated several times per year) and the SABC CSV file for electronic download (published weekly). Although the data in these files should be identical, there have been and still are very many differences between them.

In one background document from 2004, Ofcom states that In order to conform to the National Telephone Numbering Plan (NTNP), the names of the following Geographic Area Codes have changed - 1248, 1268, 1275, 1276, 1291, 1293, 1306, 1322, 1327, 1334, 1344, 1354, 1356, 1375, 1384, 1394, 1425, 1438, 1442, 1451, 1454, 1461, 1470, 1471, 1477, 1478, 1485, 1488, 1489, 1491, 1543, 1561, 1562, 1582, 1588, 1598, 1661, 1668, 1675, 1680, 1681, 1684, 1688, 1689, 1695, 1707, 1720, 1727, 1737, 1744, 1753, 1770, 1784, 1806, 1821, 1856, 1870, 1877, 1883, 1885, 1889, 1895, 1908, 1920, 1922, 1926, 1928, 1932, 1952, 1953, 1963, 1980, 1983, 1984, 1992.

However, several of the above area codes did not see any name change. It had been proposed to change some names but in the end either the original BT name continued to be used or a completely new name suggested by either BT or C&W, or by both, was adopted. The Ofcom proposal also contained a large number of spelling mistakes in the proposed area code names. Some of those errors were rectified within weeks or months, while others have still not been fixed eight years later. Additionally, several other areas changed their name after suggestions by BT and/or C&W, although Ofcom originally had no plans to change them. There are also several areas which changed name but are not listed above. Additionally some names were changed in one Ofcom document but were not updated in the other Ofcom document until several years later. Some have still not been updated or corrected.

Nine more place names were fixed in a reissued NTNP PDF document in mid-December 2011.

2003 responsibility for UK telecommunications passed from Oftel to Ofcom
In 2003, the Office of Telecommunications (Oftel) was disbanded and replaced with the Office of Communications (Ofcom).

2004 additional number ranges within existing ELNS areas
In 2004, Ofcom allocated the remaining number ranges within the 14 existing ELNS areas.

2004 additional number ranges within existing mixed areas
In 2004, Ofcom allocated the remaining number ranges within the existing 18 "mixed" areas.

2004 introduction of 056 VoIP numbers
In 2004, Ofcom started allocating 056 numbers for VoIP services. Soon after, VoIP services also appeared on geographic 01 and 02 numbers. Uptake of 056 numbers remains low. These numbers have 10 digits.

2005 to present day: new allocations within existing 02x areas
These are detailed as extra entries within the Big Number Change section above.

2005 removal of unused 09xx broadband services from number plan
Some years earlier, 092x to 099x had been designated "broadband services". With changes in technology, this allocation had never been used. It was removed from the plan in 2005.

2005 adult premium rate services begin using 098x numbers
With calls for premium rate adult services to be more clearly defined and separated from other premium rate services, the 0908 and 0909 codes were to be no longer issued for new services. Instead, the new 098x range would be used, initially 0982 but latterly also 0983, 0984 and 0989.

Some companies had attempted to avoid restrictions placed on Premium Rate Services by instead running adult services on various 070, 0871 and other number ranges. Regulations were eventually drafted to force these services to use only the designated 098x (and pre-existing 0908 and 0909) numbers.

2005 NHS banned from using 0870 and 09xx numbers
For detailed information see 

Due to concerns raised by patients having to pay unfair costs when calling NHS services by telephone, the usage of 0870 non-geographic numbers was banned by the Department of Health in 2005. At that time, 0870 numbers often cost more to call than geographic 01 and 02 numbers and were not usually included in bundled minutes. Around 400 GP surgeries used 0870 numbers and were also coming under greater scrutiny with a few reverting to geographic numbers.

Many of these services quickly moved to 0845 or 0844 revenue share numbers as they were not specifically banned, even though they also cost more to call than 01 and 02 numbers and in many cases cost more to call than 0870 numbers. Even as late as 2010 there were NHS bodies only now just getting around to complying with that ban.

2006 ASA start taking action against misleading price indications for 084 and 087 numbers
In 2006, the Advertising Standards Authority (ASA) started taking action against companies that falsely represent that "084 numbers are 'local rate' or 'lo-call' calls" or "087 numbers are 'national rate' calls". By this time, most operators no longer offered a "local call" rate, instead charging all calls to 01 and 02 numbers at the same rate, whatever the distance.

After 2005, several operators also offered 01, 02 and the newly created 03 numbers as "free minutes" within an "evening and weekend" calls bundle or within an "anytime" calls bundle. As 084 and 087 numbers were not usually included in any such bundle, costing up to 20p/min from landlines and up to 41p/min from mobiles, describing these numbers as anything other than "chargeable with an additional service charge" (or "premium" by another name) is a misleading price indication. In comparison, for many callers, calls to 01, 02 and 03 numbers had effectively become "free".

2006 new 075xx mobile numbers introduced
As a result of ever increasing mobile phone ownership, and especially the introduction of mobile broadband in the UK, the 075xx number range was opened in October 2006. This joined the existing 07624, 077xx, 078xx and 079xx ranges.

2006 introduction of 101 for non-emergency calls to the police
In 2006, the new 101 number for non-emergency calls to the police began trials in several areas with a call cost of 10 pence per call. The number was adopted nationally in 2011/2012, with a charge of 15p per call, except from payphones. The charge was scrapped in April 2020 and calls to 101 are now free from all UK landlines, mobiles and payphones.

2007 introduction of 03 non-geographic numbers
In February 2007, Ofcom announced the 03 range of numbers was being brought into use and the first numbers were issued in May. Although allocated as non-geographic, these were to be charged at the same rate as geographic 01 and 02 numbers from both landline and mobile and were also to be included within "free minutes" bundles for subscribers with a call package. Further details are in the 03 numbers section above.

2007 new 0843 and 0872 non-geographic revenue-share numbers
In May 2007, Ofcom allocated the first 0872 numbers. These follow on from the earlier 0871 code which was now fully allocated.

In November 2007, the first 0843 numbers were allocated. These follow on from the earlier, and now fully allocated, 0844 code.

These are used for revenue share services and are generally not included in bundled minutes from either mobiles or landlines. From landlines these numbers cost anything up to 20 pence per minute and from mobile phones anything up to 45 pence per minute. The price includes a revenue-share "premium" or "service charge" of up to 5 pence per minute for 0843 numbers and up to 10 pence per minute for 0872 numbers. The premium is passed on to the terminating telecoms company.

Ofcom also indicated that 0842 and 0873 will follow on from these allocations at a later date.

Due to continued misuse of the 0871 and 0872 number ranges, ICSTIS consulted on additional regulation in 2006 and announced in 2007 that both number ranges were to be regulated from 2008. After some delay they were eventually taken into the jurisdiction of PhonepayPlus  in 2009. PhonepayPlus replaced ICSTIS in 2007 and is now known as the Phone-paid Services Authority.

2008 new area code: 01987 Ebbsfleet
In 2008, a new area code was created for Ebbsfleet. Adjacent area codes no longer had enough projected spare capacity for the new development to use, so 01987 was allocated.

2009 Reform of 070 personal numbering
Ofcom had previously considered that personal numbers should migrate to 06, to replace the 070 prefix that is sometimes confused with mobile phone numbers. There is no cap on retail caller charges. Ofcom wanted 070 and 06 numbers to have a price cap, and 07 numbers to be used exclusively for mobile phones.

Companies such as Hospedia (formerly Patientline) use 070 personal numbers. After an in-depth study to better understand the market, Ofcom has changed its mind and is now proposing to drop the 060 migration concept and decided that the forced migration to 060 is no longer seen to be objectively justifiable. Premium rate and other such services were also banned from using 070 numbers.

2009 introduction of 116 xxx numbers
In 2009, Ofcom introduced the first harmonised European numbers for harmonised services of social value, and additional numbers were allocated in 2010.

2009 new 074xx mobile numbers introduced
As a result of ever increasing mobile phone and mobile broadband ownership, the 074xx number range was opened in July 2009. This joined the existing 075xx, 07624, 077xx, 078xx and 079xx ranges.

2009 revenue-share no longer allowed on 0870 non-geographic (and 070 personal) numbers
After a sustained period of abuse, revenue share was removed from 0870 and 070 numbers. Prices for calling 0870 numbers from landlines fell and some landline providers started to allow calls to 0870 numbers to appear within call-plan inclusive minutes. Revenue-share continued on 0843, 0844, 0845, 0871 and 0872 numbers.

It was anticipated that 0845 numbers would also lose their revenue share, leading BT to prematurely include these numbers within call plans. Ofcom changed their mind and the status of 0845 numbers wasn't changed. Instead, in 2010 to 2012, Ofcom eventually consulted on re-organisation of the whole of the 084 and 087 number ranges.

2009 PhonepayPlus begins regulation of 0871 and 0872 numbers
After ICSTIS consultation in 2006 and 2007 numbers beginning 0871 (and 0872) began to be regulated by PhonepayPlus, the premium rate services regulator from 1 August 2009. This brings regulation in line with existing 09xx premium rate services, 070 personal numbers and 118 xxx directory enquiries. ICSTIS became PhonepayPlus on 15 October 2007. 0871 and 0872 numbers retained their revenue-share status.

Changes since 2010

2010 GPs banned from using 0844 (and other 084x and 087x) numbers 
For detailed information see 

In December 2009, the Department of Health published directions to NHS bodies concerning the cost of telephone calls made by patients to the NHS: "An NHS body must not enter into, renew or extend a contract or other arrangement for telephone services unless it is satisfied that, having regard to the arrangement as a whole, persons will not pay more to make relevant calls to the NHS body then they would to make equivalent calls to a geographic number." This reiterated the "free at the point of delivery" principle of the NHS and the direction applied to all NHS bodies. In April 2010, the Department of Health introduced new GMS (General Medical Services) contracts so that GPs would now also be covered by the earlier direction. From this point on, the more than 6500 GP surgeries in England and Wales were banned from using phone numbers that "cost more than calling a geographic number", and given one year to comply. However, some GPs continued to use 0844 numbers.

2010 introduction of 111 for non-emergency calls to NHS
In 2010, 111 was introduced on a trial basis for non-urgent calls to the NHS. The scheme was rolled out nationally from 2013 and has replaced the NHS Direct 0845 46 47 line (in England and Wales) and the NHS 24 08454 24 24 24 line (in Scotland).

2010 additional number ranges within 0191 area code
Extra capacity assigned in late 2010, following consultation.

In the other 01x1 area codes, only (0121) 8xx, (0121) 9xx, (0131) 9xx and (0161) 5xx have yet to be allocated. 0171 and 0181 are no longer in use and 0101 and 0111 have never been allocated.

2010 Ofcom propose changes in number conservation areas
In November 2010, Ofcom proposed to abandon renumbering in areas running short of capacity and instead provide extra capacity by starting to use local numbers beginning '0' and '1', and removing the option of dialling locally using just the subscriber number. Once the supply of new numbers released by this measure is exhausted Ofcom propose introducing additional, overlay area codes to run in tandem with current codes. It is anticipated that the overlay codes would not be required before 2022.

2011 area name changes
By way of an Erratum to the National Telephone Numbering Plan, Ofcom started the lengthy process of correcting some very old errors for nine area code names in December 2011.

Some of these errors first appeared in the 2003 version of the number plan while others can also be found in older data originally produced by Oftel several years before.

As noted on Ofcom's site, the name changes still have to go through a formal consultation process, even though they are only correcting obvious spelling, hyphenation and capitalisation mistakes.

The corrections are as follows:

2012 changes in local dialling
In November 2012, local dialling was removed for calls within the 01202 area allowing subscriber numbers beginning 0 or 1 to be issued locally and buying more time before an additional area code or code change is required.

2013 changes in 080, 084 and 087 non-geographic arrangements
After initial consultation in 2010 and 2012, in April 2013 Ofcom published the final consultation on proposals to re-arrange the 080, 084 and 087 non-geographic allocations in 2014.

The 0870 range is to regain its revenue share status. Where users of 0870 numbers cannot justify revenue share they are advised to move to their reserved matching 0370 number. The workings of the 0845 range will broadly align with how 0844 and 0843 revenue share numbers already work.

Changes in how call costs for 084 and 087 non-geographic calls should in future be communicated to callers were announced. The callers phone line provider has to list a single Access Charge per tariff for the 084, 087, 09 and 118 non-geographic number ranges and the called party has to display the single Service Charge (or "premium") details for their non-geographic number.

Calls to the 'free to caller' 080 range were made free from mobile telephones, not just from landlines.

After the final announcements were made by Ofcom in the summer of 2013, the changes had an 18-month transition period before coming into effect.

2014 local number dialing 
In October 2014 certain area codes required the full area code even when dialing local numbers. The areas affected were:
 Aberdeen (01224)
 Bradford (01274)
 Brighton (01273)
 Middlesbrough (01642)
 Milton Keynes (01908)

The change was in response to a lack of free numbers in these areas. By requiring the area code for all local calls, Ofcom are able to allocate numbers starting with 1 or 0. This increases the number of telephone numbers available without requiring a number change.

2015 UK Calling legislation
On 1 July 2015, Ofcom made a number of changes to the way phone calls to UK service numbers would be charged. The cost of calls made to service numbers is now split into two parts: an access charge and a service charge. Under the new legislation, which was promoted by an information campaign entitled UK Calling, call charges must be clearly stated on all materials that advertise a service number. The 1 July changes also saw ‘freephone numbers’ 0800 and 0808 become free to call from both mobiles and landlines. 0500 numbers remained chargeable as previously from mobiles (free from landlines, also as previously), but these numbers were migrated to a new 0808 5 number range in June 2017, and are free from mobiles.

2020 Introduction of 119 
On 18 May 2020, 119 was introduced at the request of the UK Government to provide a dedicated number for calls to the NHS in England and Wales relating to the Covid-19 coronavirus pandemic response. Calls to 119 are free of charge.

Misconceptions

It is a common misconception that London still has more than one area code (i.e. "0207", "0208" and even the later "0203", which was the pre-1995 code for Coventry followed by 0204). This is incorrect in the sense that omitting the "0207" or "0208" (area) code will give a local number that cannot be connected as it is missing the first digit. Therefore, writing a London number as 020x xxx xxxx is incorrect and can lead to confusion when attempting to dial it.

The misconception of area code and number separation is also seen in other areas of the country where the area code length was reduced in the Big Number Change such as Coventry being written as 02476 xxxxxx, whereas the correct number sequence is (024) 76xx xxxx (Coventry now has some (024) 77xx xxxx and (024) 75xx xxxx numbers) and Cardiff being written as 02920 xxxxxx whereas the correct number sequence is (029) 20xx xxxx (Cardiff now has some (029) 21xx xxxx and (029) 22xx xxxx numbers).

Likewise in Portsmouth, numbers are being incorrectly written as 02392 xxxxxx, whereas the correct number sequence is (023) 92xx xxxx (Portsmouth now has some (023) 93xx xxxx numbers).

This also occurs in some areas of Northern Ireland, that previously had 5-digit and 6-digit local numbers as in Banbridge (previously (018206) xxxxx), where numbers erroneously written as 028406 xxxxx instead of (028) 406x xxxx are occasionally seen. Locals still heard misquoting the area code as 028406, more than two decades after the change. The same occurs in formerly six-digit code areas, such as Lisburn (previous (01846) xxxxxx) continues to appear as 02892 xxxxxx instead of the correct form (028) 92xx xxxx.

This is also seen in the earlier PhONEday areas, such as in Sheffield, for (0114) 2xx xxxx numbers, where these are often seen written as 01142 xxxxxx or are missing the leading digit 2 when abbreviated (751234 instead of 275 1234 for example). This is a particular problem now that (0114) 3xx xxxx local numbers are being issued.

It also affects Reading numbers where these are still being written as 01189 xxxxxx, whereas the correct number sequence is (0118) 9xx xxxx. Now that Reading has some (0118) 3xx xxxx, (0118) 4xx xxxx and (0118) 2xx xxxx numbers mis-dialling also occurs when people prefix 3xx xxxx, 4xx xxxx and 2xx xxxx numbers with 01189 instead of just 0118.

In all of these areas, the result of the confusion is that callers are adding an incorrect area code to numbers allocated within the new local number ranges, and that then results in a mis-dialled call.

Notes

References

History of telecommunications in the United Kingdom
Telephone numbers in the United Kingdom
History of the United Kingdom by topic